Rodd Penney (born 22 July 1978) is a former New Zealand rugby union player.

Career
Penney's career started in New Zealand where he played two seasons for North Harbour in the National Provincial Championship between 2001 and 2002.

With the ability to play anywhere in the outside backs Penney was named in the New Zealand Academy in 2002.

In 2003 Penney moved to England where he joined Orrell for the 2003-2004 season. It was here that Penney was selected to represent England on the international seven's circuit in 2004.

The following season Penney moved to London Irish where he played for the club between 2004 and 2006, before linking up with North London club Saracens in 2006. Penney spent the middle part of the 2010 - 2011 season playing for the newly formed Aironi (which became de-funct in 2012) in the Pro 12, but returned to Saracens that same year.

Penney remained at Saracens until retiring in 2011 having played over 100 games for the club.

Personal life
He is the older brother of international basketball player Kirk Penney.

References

1978 births
Living people
London Irish players
Saracens F.C. players
New Zealand rugby union players
Rugby union players from Auckland
New Zealand expatriate sportspeople in England
Rugby union centres
Rugby union wings